Anthony Francis Arins (born 26 October 1958) is an English former professional footballer who played as a full-back.

Arins started his career with Burnley and made his professional debut on 18 November 1978 in the 5–3 win over Fulham in the Football League Second Division. He scored his first senior goal on 3 November 1979 in the 1–2 defeat to Orient. He played his final game for Burnley on 26 April 1980 when he started in the 0–0 draw with Birmingham City at Turf Moor. In the summer of 1981, Arins signed for Leeds United but left after playing only one match for the club. He spent the remainder of the season with Scunthorpe United, making 20 league appearances and scoring one goal for the side. Arins retired from football in 1982 to join the police force.
He retired from the police service in May 2016.

Honours
Burnley
Anglo-Scottish Cup: 1978

References

1958 births
Living people
English footballers
Association football defenders
Burnley F.C. players
Leeds United F.C. players
Scunthorpe United F.C. players
English Football League players
Footballers from Chesterfield